M. Kathy Rudy is an American women's studies scholar. A professor at Duke University, Rudy's work is often interdisciplinary as she merges philosophy, theology, politics, feminism, and medical ethics. She is open about her homosexuality and is a radical social constructionist.

Rudy penned a controversial opinion piece that alleged that white culture hypocrisy was responsible for the prosecution of the admitted animal abuser Michael Vick.

Another somewhat controversial piece offered by Kathy Rudy comes from her newest book, Loving Animals: A New Approach to Animal Advocacy (2011). In this book, Rudy argues against veganism, claiming that humans and animals have spent 10,000 years forming a particular relationship [one that results in humans eating animals], and that particular relationship is good for both sides. The animals are given days in the sun, grass to eat, fields to graze, and the humans - in return - are able to eat them. In her interview with Vegan.com, Rudy explains that she attempted veganism for about one year, any due to her lack of preparation and guidance, she was left in worse health than when she started. She admits, "I ate like an idiot, and I’m blaming veganism for my health problems instead of the crappy food I shoveled into my mouth. I am an academic who couldn’t be bothered to read a book covering vegan nutrition before embarking on a major change of diet."

Rudy is well known at Duke University, where she teaches a variety of topics including: Feminist Ethics, Reproductive Ethics, Gender and Popular Culture, and Debates in Women's Studies. Through her progressive work, Kathy was awarded the David Paletz Course Enhancement Award in 2012.

Works 
 Loving Animals: A New Approach to Animal Advocacy (2011). University of Minnesota Press. 
 Sex and the Church: Gender, Homosexuality and the Transformation of Christian Ethics (1997). Beacon Press. 
 Beyond Pro-life and Pro-choice: Moral Diversity in the Abortion Debate (1996). Beacon Press.

References

External links
 "Q&A: Whole New World" Duke Magazine, September–October 2005 (Volume 91, No.5)

Living people
American feminists
American women's rights activists
Duke University faculty
Lesbian feminists
American lesbian writers
American LGBT rights activists
Feminist theologians
American sociologists
American women sociologists
Queer theologians
Women's studies academics
Year of birth missing (living people)
Women religious writers
Social constructionism